Monaco has participated in the Eurovision Song Contest 24 times since its debut in . The country's only win in the contest came in  when Séverine performed "Un banc, un arbre, une rue".

Monaco finished last at its first contest in 1959 before achieving three top three results in the 1960s. Severine's victory in 1971 was the first of five top four results in eight years.

Monaco is the only country to have internally selected all of their participants. While some countries organise televised national finals, it is believed that TMC does not have enough funding to organise national finals.

The Monegasque broadcaster then withdrew from the contest, stating that regional voting patterns in the contest have effectively given Monaco no chance of qualifying for the final.

History 

Monaco participated in the contest 21 times between its debut in 1959 and 1979. Afterwards the country withdrew from the contest for financial reasons and lack of interest. It only returned in 2004, 25 years after its last participation. It withdrew again in 2007, after failing to qualify for the final for three consecutive years.

The Monegasque victory is rather particular in the history of Eurovision as neither the songwriter, the singer, nor director were from the country they represented, something which also was the case with four of Luxembourg’s five victories. Séverine even declared to journalists that she had never set foot in Monaco, forgetting that the video-clip was filmed there. Séverine's producer was dishonest with her and stole her prize, thus she never got paid for her victory, even after suing him. Nevertheless, the singer is still a great fan of the contest.

Host country 
Monaco is the only country that has won the contest but has never organised it. After winning in 1971, the country decided to organise the 1972 contest as an open-air show, setting the date in June rather than early spring. However, because of a lack of funds and material, Télé Monte Carlo sought help from the French public broadcaster, ORTF, which accepted to organise the contest. Because TMC wanted the show to be held in Monaco while ORTF wanted it in France, negotiations never succeeded. Monaco left it up to the EBU. The EBU asked Spain and Germany, who respectively finished second and third at the 1971 contest, but the countries were not interested in organising the 1972 contest. It was eventually organised by the BBC in Edinburgh.

Absence
Monaco was absent from the contest between 1980 and 2003, before returning for three years from 2004–2006. During their three year return, all the artists representing the country, Maryon (2004), Lise Darly (2005) and Séverine Ferrer (2006), failed to qualify to the finals. TMC did broadcast the 2007 contest, making the country eligible to participate in the Eurovision Song Contest 2008, but TMC decided against it.

TMC had announced that it was possible Monaco would return to the contest in 2009 after a two-year absence, following talks with the European Broadcasting Union (EBU), as well as new voting measures implemented in the contest that year. Despite this, Monaco did not compete in Moscow in 2009. The EBU announced they would work harder to bring Monaco back into the contest in  alongside other lapsed participants.

Former head of the Monégasque delegation Philippe Boscagli has accused certain countries of geopolitical voting, alleging the existence of Eastern European, Nordic and Old European voting blocs, henceforth hindering Monaco's chances for qualification. With regards to the non-qualification of the Monégasque entry in 2006, "La Coco-Dance", he claimed that the audience voted more for the show than the song. Furthermore, TMC is now part of the TF1 Group, the leading private broadcaster in France, and is now available everywhere in France. TMC programs no longer revolve around the principality. As TF1 Group being the biggest competitor to the French public channels, it is very unlikely that TMC will again broadcast the contest. When TMC did so between 2004 and 2006, its audience was much smaller than the one of the French public channel. In those years, it was the government and the municipality of Monaco who chose the contestant and funded the delegation, while it is usually the responsibility of a broadcaster or a producer.

On 22 November 2021, L'Observateur de Monaco reported that 100,000 Euros have been allocated towards "initiating the application of the Principality to the Eurovision 2023 competition" in the state budget for 2022. However, the launch of Monte-Carlo Riviera was later delayed to between June and September 2023, meaning Monaco will not be able to return to the contest until at least 2024.

Participation overview 
Due to the country's very small size, all Monaco's entrants came from outside the principality, although French-born Minouche Barelli, who represented the principality in 1967, shared her time between Paris and Monaco, acquired Monegasque citizenship in 2002, and died in the principality on 20 February 2004 at the age of 56. The large majority of the participant were French, with also one Yugoslavian, Tereza Kesovija, and one Luxembourgian, Mary Christy (born Marie Ruggeri). Several singers selected to represent Monaco are key figures of the French scene, such as Françoise Hardy and Michèle Torr. Luxembourg, another small country, also sent a great number of French artists to the contest. At the 1967 contest, the Monegasque entry, "", sung by Minouche Barelli, was written by Serge Gainsbourg. He had already composed the winning entry in 1965, "", sung by France Gall for Luxembourg. Jean Jacques, who represented Monaco in 1969, was the first child to take part in Eurovision. He was 12 years old, making him the first preteen to participate and the first participant to be born after the inauguration of the contest.

Related involvement

Heads of delegation

Commentators and spokespersons

From 1959 to 1970, Monaco did not have its own commentators in the festival, Télé Monte Carlo used French commentary instead (RTF 1959–1964 and ORTF 1965–1970). From 1971 until 1979, and between 2004 and 2006, TMC did broadcast the contest with its own commentators, but they were French. As TMC had been available in the South-East of France since the 1980s and by digital terrestrial television throughout the country since 2005, French audience was able to watch the Eurovision Song Contest on both France 3 and TMC in 2004, 2005 and 2006 (the semi-final of 2004 only on TMC though).

Notes

References

External links
Points to and from Monaco eurovisioncovers.co.uk

 
Countries in the Eurovision Song Contest